Christian Ehrenfried von Weigel (24 May 1748 – 8 August 1831) was a Swedish-born German scientist and, beginning in 1774, a professor of chemistry, pharmacy, botany, and mineralogy at the University of Greifswald.

Biography
Born in Stralsund, in 1771 he received his medical doctorate from the University of Göttingen, having studied under Johann Christian Erxleben. In 1806, Weigel was ennobled and carried from then on a von in his name. He became the personal physician of the Swedish royal house two years later. Among other things, Weigel developed a cooling heat exchanger (German ) (1771), which was later improved upon by Justus von Liebig and then became known as the Liebig condenser. Furthermore, the honeysuckle genus Weigela is named after him.

In 1792, he was elected a foreign member of the Royal Swedish Academy of Sciences.

References

External links 
 Weigel biography

 
 
 
 

1748 births
1831 deaths
Pteridologists
Botanists with author abbreviations
18th-century German botanists
18th-century German chemists
German mycologists
German untitled nobility
People from Stralsund
People from Swedish Pomerania
Academic staff of the University of Greifswald
Members of the Royal Swedish Academy of Sciences
University of Göttingen alumni
19th-century German chemists